Baba Kamal (also Romanized as Bābā Kamāl) is a village in Kamal Rud Rural District, Qolqol Rud District, Tuyserkan County, Hamadan Province, Iran. At the 2006 census, its population was 830, in 220 families.

References 

Populated places in Tuyserkan County